Dick Averns (born March 1st 1964) is a Canadian artist who produces installations, sculptures, photography, text and performances.

Life
Averns was born in London, UK in 1964.

Work
Averns writings include Art in the Face of The Project for The New American Century and Cataloging Canada’s Schools of Art and Design for Artichoke magazine. Averns' recent installation Preoccupation revolves around the conceptual location of Ambivalence Blvd.

References

External links
Official site
Dick Averns Biography in the Centre for Contemporary Canadian Art database

Canadian multimedia artists
Artists from Alberta
English emigrants to Canada
Living people
1964 births